The Russo-Georgian War caused major infrastructural and economic damage throughout Georgian and South Ossetian territory. Many countries promised reconstruction aid to the affected regions.

Georgia 
A donors' conference for Georgia was scheduled to be held on October 21 or October 22. On 20 October 2008, on the sidelines of an international high level conference in Belgium on "The Future of Parliamentary Involvement in Global Health and Development" the humanitarian situation in Georgia was also discussed. On 22 October 2008, the United States pledged $1 billion economic support package at a European Union-sponsored donors’ conference in Brussels; this came in addition to aid of nearly $40 million in emergency humanitarian assistance delivered by USAID and the U.S. Defense Department during the crisis. The European Commission added another "up to" €500 million. While many nations did not disclose their actual pledges, diplomats said Germany had pledged €33.7 million to add to their pre-war offer of €35 million. Sweden also ranked high on the list of most generous donors with €40 million while France promised €7 million. Japan pledged $200 million in recovery aid over three years, primarily for rebuilding roads and rail systems, but they also joined delegates to urge Georgia to continue progress on democratic and economic reforms. The International Monetary Fund offered a $750 million loan package, while the European Investment Bank offered €200 million in loans to rebuild infrastructure.

In total, the Brussels conference agreed to deliver $4.55 billion for Georgia. The amount far exceeded the $3.25 billion estimate of the World Bank and United Nations.

Georgian Prime Minister Lado Gurgenidze said, "We are deeply moved and humbled by the demonstration of solidarity and support that we have received," additionally noting the pledges were made despite the ongoing effects of a global financial crisis. He then added that "Every single, euro, dollar and pound will make Georgia stronger, more prosperous, freer, more democratic and more genuinely and thoroughly European." "(It) will alleviate, to a significant degree, the human suffering that has resulted in the aftermath of the Aug. 7 conflict." Joint summit host, EU External Affairs Commissioner Benita Ferrero-Waldner, said of the occasion and its outcome that "This is a day of joy."

South Ossetia 

In September 2008, Russia sent hundreds of workers to rebuild Tskhinvali and promised cash payments for every South Ossetian. South Ossetian Prime Minister Boris Chochiev said that Russia "promised to pay South Ossetians up to $2,000 each in compensation for war damage." In September 2008 Russia financed payment of pensions for South Ossetian pensioners, financed aid for unemployed and subsidised families that lost their houses during the war. Russian reconstruction aid for South Ossetia was $490 million. However, there were serious concerns about the effectiveness of the distribution of Russian aid by South Ossetian authorities.

In March 2009, Russian Prime Minister Vladimir Putin ordered the Finance Ministry to initiate an agreement on financial assistance to Abkhazia and South Ossetia. Russia would allocate 8.5 billion rubles to South Ossetia in order to assist in rebuilding housing, social amenities and utilities damaged during the war. According to Eduard Kokoity, seventy percent of residential housing and eighty percent of administrative buildings in Tskhinval were destroyed in the Georgian shelling of the city in 2008.

The Dzuarikau–Tskhinvali gas pipeline from North Ossetia to Tskhinvali was launched on 26 August 2009. The new pipeline was reported to have cost 15 billion rubles (US$476 million). Before the construction, South Ossetia was supplied by gas through the Agara-Tskhinvali leg of the Georgian Tbilisi-Kutaisi trunk system. Dzuarikau-Tskhinvali gas pipeline is one of the highest-altitude pipelines in the world.

References

Russo-Georgian War